Kentropyx pelviceps, the forest whiptail, is a species of teiid lizard found in Ecuador, Colombia, Peru, Brazil, and Bolivia.

References

pelviceps
Reptiles described in 1868
Taxa named by Edward Drinker Cope